Poe is an unincorporated community in central Alberta in Beaver County, located on Highway 14,  northeast of Camrose.

Localities in Beaver County, Alberta